Jonas Lewis (born December 27, 1976) is a former American football linebacker. He played for the San Francisco 49ers from 2000 to 2001 and for the Montreal Alouettes from 2004 to 2005.

References

1976 births
Living people
American football linebackers
San Diego State Aztecs football players
San Francisco 49ers players
Frankfurt Galaxy players
Montreal Alouettes players
American football running backs